was a Japanese auxiliary minelayer/merchant ship, sunk in Mbaeroko Bay, near Munda, during a World War II bombing raid on 2 July 1943.

Kashi Maru was built in 1940 at the Osaka Iron Works. The ship was unloading a cargo of fuel and vehicles when she was attacked and sunk by USAAF B-25 bombers, escorted by USN F4U fighters.

The site of the shipwreck is popular for divers, and was featured in the Nature episode "War Wrecks of the Coral Seas".

References

1940 ships
World War II merchant ships of Japan
Ships sunk by US aircraft
Shipwrecks in Ironbottom Sound
Solomon Islands in World War II
Wreck diving sites
Ships built by Osaka Iron Works